The Dublin Junior Football championship is the Junior Gaelic Athletic Association Gaelic football competition of Dublin. The winners of the Junior championship go on to qualify for the Dublin Intermediate Football Championship. The winners will also represent Dublin in the Leinster Junior Club Football Championship. St Vincent's are the most successful club in the Junior A championship having won the competition on six occasions, with their most recent victory in 2014 beating Craobh Ciarain in the final.

New format
In 2018, the grading system of Junior Championships was drastically changed. The Dublin Junior Football Championship is divided between Junior 1 and 2.

Junior 1 consists of 16 teams who are divided into four groups of four. The top two sides in each group are then included in an open draw for the quarter finals of the championship. The team that wins the Dublin Junior Football Championship is promoted to the Dublin Intermediate Championship. The teams that finish at the bottom of their respective groups go on to play in a relegation championship. The eventual loser drops to the Dublin Junior Football Championship 2.

Junior 2 consists of 14 teams who are divided into two groups of three and two groups of four. The top two sides in each group are then included in an open draw for the quarter finals of the championship. No team can be relegated from the Dublin Junior Football Championship 2.

A club that has a team in the Intermediate or Senior Championship will compete in the All County Championship. The all county championship is divided in three divisions and participation will vary each year depending on each club's performance in higher graded divisions. The winner of each all county championship will progress to a higher ranking all county championship if they do not already have a side in that championship.

Junior 1

Junior 1

Junior 2

Junior 3

Junior 4

Junior 5

Junior 6

Junior Football A

Roll of Honour

Junior Football B

Roll of Honour

Junior Football C/3

The 2020 Junior 3 All County Football Championship will be contested by Clontarf and St Patrick's, Donabate.

Roll of Honour

Junior Football D

Roll of Honour

Junior Football E

The Junior E Championship was created at the start of the 2008 season and is open to clubs who only have one adult team taking part in the Adult Football Leagues.

This championship is played on a round robin format which gives each team three championship games a year.

Park Rangers won the First Junior E Final in 2008, defeating Wild Geese, who themselves would taste glory a year later in 2009.

In 2010 Rosmini Gaels won their first championship since winning the original Junior A championship in 1985. Two players from the '85 team played in the 2010 final. Rosmini Gaels repeated their victory in 2012.

The 2014 Junior E Final took place on September 20 between St Kevin Killians and St Colmcilles of Swords in O'Toole Park. In a hard-fought close game, St Colmcilles came out on top to claim the first championship win in the history of the club and in the process going one step further than the previous year in which they finished up as runners-up.

AIB defeated Rosmini Gaels in the 2015 final after extra time to claim their first Junior E title.

In 2016 Cloghran outfit Starlights lifted the crown defeating Beann Eadair in the final.

Roll of Honour

Junior Football F/6
The First ever Dublin Junior 6 All County Football Final was contested by St Annes and Clontarf

Roll of Honour

Notes and references

Junior
Junior Gaelic football county championships